Coningsby  is a town and civil parish in the East Lindsey district in Lincolnshire, England, it is situated on the A153 road, adjoining Tattershall on its western side,  north west of Boston and  south west from Horncastle.

Governance
Coningsby is the most populous parish in the electoral ward of Coningsby and Tattershall. The population of this ward taken at the 2011 Census was 6,943.

Geography

The town takes its name from the Old Norse konungr meaning "King" and the Old Norse noun by meaning "settlement", which gives "settlement of the King". The B1192 Kirton to Woodhall Spa road passes through the town. At the town's western end it is separated from the village of Tattershall by the River Bain.
 
The Kirkstead and Little Steeping Railway passing through the town opened on 1 July 1913 but closed on 5 July 1970. The former Coningsby railway station has been demolished and nothing remains except for the station master's house.

Education
Coningsby St Michael's C of E Primary School is on School Lane. The secondary school is Barnes Wallis Academy, the Gartree Community School, is just outside the Coningsby boundary in Tattershall, near the A153. Queen Elizabeth's Grammar School provides sixth form education to pupils graduating from Gartree and other secondary modern schools.
RAF Coningsby Nursery and Kids Club provides childcare for military personnel and the community.

The nearest further education college is in Boston. In late March 2008, renovation of the Tattershall/Coningsby Library included a small learning centre provided by Boston College.

Parish church

Coningsby is overlooked by the tower of its 15th-century parish church, St Michael's, with its one-handed clock face. The face is painted directly onto the wall of the tower and was probably installed in the 17th century. The driving weights are large stones and its pendulum swings once every two seconds. The pendulum is not attached to the clock but some distance away, linked by a connecting rod. There are three wheels in the timekeeping mechanism, which needs winding once a day. The tower on which the clock face is painted is on the outside of the building. There is an arched passage under the tower which is part of a public footpath from the A153 High Street to the school in School Lane, through the churchyard.

There is also a canonical sundial, dating from the 12th century, on the south wall of the church.

In 1730, Britain's youngest Poet Laureate, Laurence Eusden who was appointed aged thirty, was buried in the church where he had been Rector. Two decades later another poet, John Dyer, was appointed as Rector and while living in the village completed his poem "The Fleece". He died there of consumption (tuberculosis) in 1757, and was buried without memorial in the church chancel.

Amenities
Public houses include the Black Swan, The Castle Inn and the White Bull, are all on High Street, and the Lea Gate Inn on Leagate Road (B1192).

RAF Coningsby

Half a mile (1 km) to the south of the town is RAF Coningsby, one of the Royal Air Force's most important stations, home of No. 3 Squadron, No. XI Squadron, No. 29 Squadron and No.41 (R) Squadron

The airfield houses part of Britain's heritage, the Battle of Britain Memorial Flight formed in 1957 to commemorate the Royal Air Force's major battle honours, with a Lancaster, five Spitfires, two Hurricanes and a Dakota. These aircraft still fly and can be seen at air shows during summer, as well as at events of national importance or RAF significance.

From 1950 RAF Coningsby was home to three squadrons of Washingtons, the RAF name for the American B29 bombers ("Superfortresses") and for the first 18 months these were maintained by National Service technicians whose conscription was extended to 24 months because of their particular skills.

Economy
Pellcroft Engineering Ltd, in Coningsby, is a company selling agricultural fans.

References

External links

 Coningsby Town Council
 "St Michael & All Angels, Coningsby", Geograph.org.uk
 "River Bain, Coningsby", Geograph.org.uk
 "Railway Bridge at Coningsby", Geograph.org.uk

Towns in Lincolnshire
Civil parishes in Lincolnshire
East Lindsey District